William Penn Patrick (March 31, 1930 – June 9, 1973) was an American entrepreneur, businessman, and fraudster.  He was the owner of Holiday Magic, Leadership Dynamics, and Mind Dynamics.  Patrick was a proponent of the sour grapes philosophy, and has been widely quoted as stating:  "Those who condemn wealth are those who have none and see no chance of getting it."

Patrick tried unsuccessfully to enter politics, first running against Ronald Reagan for the Republican nomination for governor of California, and was later nominated by the California Theocratic Party for Vice President of the United States. Patrick was a member of the John Birch Society.

In 1972 an F-86 Sabre jet, owned by Patrick, crashed into an ice cream parlor in Sacramento, killing 22 people on the ground. Patrick was not the pilot at that time, but a year later he died in a crash in his P-51D Mustang in Lakeport, California.

Political career 
Patrick sought out the Republican nomination for governor of California, in 1966.  Patrick alleged that a pollster, Mervin Field, had accepted money to influence a poll in the campaign.  Mervin Field sued Patrick for libel, for damages of US$4 million, and was awarded US$300,000.  Patrick later lost the nomination, to Ronald Reagan.  The New Republic described Patrick's campaign strategy as that of "out-Reaganing Ronald Reagan".  In 1967, Patrick formed a fundraising group to run for Thomas Kuchel's Senate seat.  Patrick was later nominated for Vice President of the United States, in 1967, by the California Theocratic Party.  The Los Angeles Times referred to Patrick as the "strangest politician".  He was mainly popular among ultraconservative and ultra right political circles in California.

Businessman 
Patrick began his experience in sales selling products door-to-door in Illinois.  He was the owner of companies including Leadership Dynamics, a controversial company which was the first form of Large Group Awareness Training, and Holiday Magic, a door-to-door cosmetics company later termed by the United States Federal government to be fraudulent.  Mind Dynamics was initially founded by Alexander Everett, and Patrick backed the company before buying it.  Patrick's companies were later investigated by the Securities and Exchange Commission, on allegations of pyramid schemes.  Leadership Dynamics folded amidst lawsuits and allegations of physical and sexual abuse.

Death 
William Penn Patrick died on June 9, 1973, at age 43, in the crash of his privately owned P-51D Mustang near his farm at Clearlake Oaks, California. He was flying the plane at the time; after making a low pass, he pulled up steeply, stalled, and entered a spin from which he did not recover. Although he was a certified pilot, he had only 154 hours of flight time in the P-51D, and only about four hours over the preceding three months.  He was flying with Christian George Hagert, 30, director of Holiday Magic of Helsinki, Finland, who also died in the crash.

References 

1930 births
1973 deaths
Accidental deaths in California
Aviators killed in aviation accidents or incidents in the United States
California Republicans
John Birch Society members
People associated with direct selling
People from San Rafael, California
People from Washington County, North Carolina
20th-century American businesspeople
Victims of aviation accidents or incidents in 1973
Pyramid and Ponzi schemes